The 2016 Sundance Film Festival took place from January 21 to January 31, 2016. The first lineup of competition films was announced on December 2, 2015. The opening night film was Norman Lear: Just Another Version of You, directed by Heidi Ewing and Rachel Grady. The closing night film was Louis Black and Karen Bernstein's Richard Linklater: Dream Is Destiny.

Awards
The following awards were presented:

 Grand Jury Prize: Dramatic – The Birth of a Nation by Nate Parker
 Directing Award: Dramatic – Daniel Scheinert and Daniel Kwan for Swiss Army Man
 Waldo Salt Screenwriting Award – Chad Hartigan for Morris From America
 U.S. Dramatic Special Jury Award – Miles Joris-Peyrafitte for As You Are
 U.S. Dramatic Special Jury Award for Breakthrough Performance – Joe Seo for Spa Night
 U.S. Dramatic Special Jury Award for Individual Performance – Melanie Lynskey for The Intervention and Craig Robinson for Morris from America
 Grand Jury Prize: Documentary –  Weiner by Elyse Steinberg and Josh Kriegman
 Directing Award: Documentary – Roger Ross Williams for Life, Animated
 U.S. Documentary Special Jury Award for Editing – Penny Lane and Thom Stylinski for NUTS!
 Special Jury Prize for Social Impact: Documentary – Trapped by Dawn Porter
 U.S. Documentary Special Jury Award for Writing – Robert Greene for Kate Plays Christine
 Special Jury Prize for Verité Filmmaking: Documentary – The Bad Kids by Keith Fulton and Lou Pepe
 World Cinema Grand Jury Prize: Dramatic – Sand Storm by Elite Zexer
 World Cinema Directing Award: Dramatic – Felix van Groeningen for Belgica
 World Cinema Dramatic Special Jury Award for Acting – Vicky Hernandez and Manolo Cruz for Between Land and Sea
 World Cinema Dramatic Special Jury Award for Screenwriting – Ana Katz and Inés Bortagaray for Mi Amiga del Parque
 World Cinema Dramatic Special Jury Award for Unique Vision & Design – The Lure by Agnieszka Smoczyńska
 World Cinema Jury Prize: Documentary – Sonita by Rokhsareh Ghaemmaghami
 World Cinema Directing Award: Documentary – Michal Marczak for All These Sleepless Nights
 World Cinema Documentary Special Jury Award for Best Debut Feature – Heidi Brandenburg and Mathew Orzel for When Two Worlds Collide
 World Cinema Documentary Special Jury Award for Best Cinematography – Pieter-Jan De Pue for The Land of the Enlightened
 World Cinema Documentary Special Jury Award for Editing – Mako Kamitsuna and John Maringouin for We Are X
 Audience Award: Dramatic – The Birth of a Nation (2016 film) by Nate Parker
 Audience Award: Documentary – Jim: The James Foley Story by Brian Oakes
 World Cinema Audience Award: Dramatic – Between Sea and Land by Manolo Cruz and Carlos del Castillo
 World Cinema Audience Award: Documentary – Sonita by Rokhsareh Ghaemmaghami
 Best of NEXT Audience Award – First Girl I Loved by Kerem Sanga
 Short Film Grand Jury Prize – Thunder Road by Jim Cummings
 Short Film Jury Award: US Fiction – The Procedure by Calvin Lee Reeder
 Short Film Jury Award: International Fiction – Maman(s) by Maïmouna Doucouré
 Short Film Jury Award: Non-fiction – Bacon and God's Wrath by Sol Friedman
 Short Film Jury Award: Animation – Edmond by Nina Gantz
 Short Film Special Jury Award for Outstanding Performance – Grace Glowicki for Her Friend Adam
 Short Film Special Jury Award for Best Direction – Ondřej Hudeček for Peacock
 Alfred P. Sloan Prize – Embrace of the Serpent by Ciro Guerra

Films

U.S. Dramatic Competition

As You Are by Miles Joris-Peyrafitte
Christine by Antonio Campos
Equity by Meera Menon
Goat by Andrew Neel
Joshy by Jeff Baena
Lovesong by So Yong Kim
Morris from America by Chad Hartigan
Other People by Chris Kelly
Southside With You by Richard Tanne
Spa Night by Andrew Ahn
Swiss Army Man by Daniel Kwan & Daniel Scheinert
Tallulah by Sian Heder
The Birth of a Nation by Nate Parker
The Free World by Jason Lew
The Intervention by Clea DuVall
White Girl by Elizabeth Wood

U.S. Documentary Competition
Audrie & Daisy by Bonni Cohen, Jon Shenk
Author: The JT LeRoy Story by Jeff Feuerzeig 
The Bad Kids by Keith Fulton & Lou Pepe 
Gleason by Clay Tweel
Holy Hell by Will Allen
How to Let Go of the World (and Love All the Things Climate Can’t Change) by Josh Fox
Jim: The James Foley Story by Brian Oakes
Kate Plays Christine by Robert Greene 
Kiki by Sara Jordenö
Life, Animated by Roger Ross Williams
Newtown by Kim A. Snyder
NUTS! by Penny Lane
Suited by Jason Benjamin
Trapped by Dawn Porter
Uncle Howard by Aaron Brookner
Weiner by Josh Kriegman & Elyse Steinberg

Premieres 
 Agnus Dei by Anne Fontaine
 Ali and Nino by Asif Kapadia
 Captain Fantastic by Matt Ross
 Certain Women by Kelly Reichardt
 Complete Unknown by Joshua Marston
 Frank & Lola by Matthew Ross
 Hunt for the Wilderpeople by Taika Waititi
 Indignation by James Schamus
 Jacqueline Argentine by Bernardo Britto
 Little Men by Ira Sachs
 Love and Friendship by Whit Stillman
 Manchester by the Sea by Kenneth Lonergan
 Mr. Pig by Diego Luna
 Sing Street by John Carney
 Sophie and the Rising Sun by Maggie Greenwald
 The Fundamentals of Caring by Rob Burnett
 The Hollars by John Krasinski
 Wiener-Dog by Todd Solondz

Midnight
 31 by Rob Zombie
 Antibirth by Danny Perez
 The Blackout Experiments by Rich Fox
 Carnage Park by Mickey Keating
 The Greasy Strangler by Jim Hosking
 Outlaws and Angels by JT Mollner
 Trash Fire by Richard Bates, Jr.
 Under the Shadow by Babak Anvari
 Yoga Hosers by Kevin Smith

World Cinema Dramatic Competition
 Belgica by Felix van Groeningen
 Between Sea and Land by Manolo Cruz & Carlos del Castillo
 Brahman Naman by Qaushiq Mukherjee
 A Good Wife by Mirjana Karanović
 Halal Love (and Sex) by Assad Fouladkar
 The Lure by Agnieszka Smoczynska
 Male Joy, Female Love by Yao Huang
 Mammal by Rebecca Daly
 My Friend from the Park by Ana Katz
 Much Ado About Nothing by Alejandro Fernández Almendras
 Sand Storm by Elite Zexer
 Wild by Nicolette Krebitz

World Cinema Documentary Competition
 All These Sleepless Nights by Michal Marczak
 A Flag Without a Country by Bahman Ghobadi
 Hooligan Sparrow by Nanfu Wang
 The Land of the Enlightened by Pieter-Jan De Pue
 The Lovers and the Despot by Robert Cannan & Ross Adam
 Plaza de la Soledad by Maya Goded
 The Settlers by Shimon Dotan
 Sky Ladder: The Art of Cai Guo-Qiang by Kevin Macdonald
 Sonita by Rokhsareh Ghaemmaghami
 We Are X by Stephen Kijak
 When Two Worlds Collide by Heidi Brandenburg & Mathew Orzel

Juries
Jury members, for each program of the festival, including the Alfred P. Sloan Jury, which also took part in the Science in Film Forum Panel, were announced on January 12, 2016.

U.S. Documentary Jury
Simon Kilmurry*
Jill Lepore*
Shola Lynch*
Louie Psihoyos*
Amy Ziering*

U.S. Dramatic Jury
Lena Dunham*
Jon Hamm*
Avy Kaufman*
Randall Poster*
Franklin Leonard*

World Documentary Jury
Mila Aung-Thwin*
Tine Fischer*
Asif Kapadia*

World Dramatic Jury
Mark Adams*
Fernanda Solorzano*
Apichatpong Weerasethakul*

Alfred P. Sloan Jury
Kerry Bishé
Mike Cahill
Shane Carruth
Clifford Johnson
Ting Wu

Short Film Jury
Keegan-Michael Key
Gina Kwon
Amy Nicholson

Acquisitions
Ahead of the festival opening distributor Netflix obtained worldwide streaming rights to Tallulah and Iranian horror film Under the Shadow. Oscilloscope Laboratories also obtained U.S. distribution rights to The Fits before its Sundance debut. Amazon also acquired the rights to Manchester by the Sea and Love & Friendship (the latter in collaboration with Roadside Attractions).

References

External links

2016 film festivals
2016 in Utah
2016
2016 in American cinema
2016 festivals in the United States
January 2016 events in the United States